"Find the River" is a song by American rock band R.E.M., released on November 29, 1993, as the sixth and final single from their eighth album, Automatic for the People (1992).

Background 
Regarding the song's backing vocals, Mike Mills explained to Melody Maker

Reception 
"Find the River" reached number 54 on the UK Singles Charts in December 1993. It did not chart in the US. It was one of only three R.E.M. singles released in the 1990s (out of a total of 24) to not make the Top 40 in Britain.

Martin Aston from Music Week gave the song four out of five, writing that the sixth single to be lifted from Automatic for the People "will doubtless follow REM's five previous singles into the charts. Two new B-sides, including the MTV Music Awards version of "Everybody Hurts", are the tempters for the serious fans. Otherwise, the single's slow, moody swing has something winterish about it to take it high up the charts." In a 1992 review of the album, Rolling Stone writer Paul Evans said, "R.E.M. has never made music more gorgeous" than "Find the River", calling it a "masterpiece". Alex Kadis from Smash Hits gave it four out of five, adding, "It's a gentle meandering folky job with accoustic guitars a-thrummin' and a-strummin'. And it's beautiful."

Music video 
The accompanying music video for "Find the River" was shot in September 1992 in Malibu, California, directed by Jodi Wille, and features a stripped-down studio performance by the band and Los Angeles "outsider" artist Henry Hill. In An Hour with R.E.M., which aired on MTV UK prior to the band's televised performance at Cologne Cathedral in 2001, Mike Mills introduced the video and explained that he selected it "because... I've never seen it, and I have absolutely no idea what's on it."

In the Warner Bros. promotional film for Automatic for the People, the band is seen performing the song live in their Clayton Street rehearsal room.

Track listings 
All songs were written by Bill Berry, Peter Buck, Mike Mills, and Michael Stipe.

UK 7-inch and cassette single
 "Find the River" – 3:49
 "Everybody Hurts" (live) – 5:32

UK CD single
 "Find the River" – 3:49
 "Everybody Hurts" (live) – 5:32
 "Orange Crush" (instrumental) – 3:54
Note: "Everybody Hurts" was recorded at MTV Video Music Awards, Universal City, California, on September 2, 1993.

Charts

Weekly charts

Year-end charts

References 

1992 songs
1993 singles
R.E.M. songs
Song recordings produced by Bill Berry
Song recordings produced by Michael Stipe
Song recordings produced by Mike Mills
Song recordings produced by Peter Buck
Song recordings produced by Scott Litt
Songs written by Bill Berry
Songs written by Michael Stipe
Songs written by Mike Mills
Songs written by Peter Buck
Warner Records singles